Head Cases is an American primetime comedy-drama television program, best known as the first show cancelled for the 2005–06 season. It was broadcast by Fox and aired from September 14 to 21, 2005.

Premise
The program starred Chris O'Donnell as Jason Payne, who was a superstar attorney at a prestigious law firm until his career put a strain on his marriage.  Eventually, Payne had a nervous breakdown and was sent to a "wellness center" where he recovered.  Upon leaving the center, Payne's therapist "buddied him up" with another patient and lawyer, Russell Shultz (played by Adam Goldberg), who suffered from explosive disorder.  As Payne's world continued to crumble around him, he found that his only friend seems to be Shultz.  Ultimately, Payne and Shultz decided to open a law firm of their own.

O'Donnell, who is best known for more of his film work, was quoted in a TV Guide article about his reasons for trying a television series:
I'd been taking a break [from movies] when this script kind of fell in my lap.  I read it and loved it. It's a terrific character, plus I couldn't be more excited to work with the cast that's been put together.

I've got three kids, and my oldest is starting kindergarten, so the idea of being in one place was very appealing to me.

The program was created by Bill Chais, who along with  Barry Josephson and Jeff Rake served as executive producers.

Cast

 Chris O'Donnell – Jason Payne
 Adam Goldberg – Russell Shultz
 Richard Kind – Lou Albertini 
 Rhea Seehorn – Nicole Walker
 Rockmond Dunbar – Dr. Robinson
 Krista Allen – Laurie Payne
 Jake Cherry – Ryan Payne

Rachael Leigh Cook was also a cast member, but her role was eliminated after the pilot.

Episodes

Reception
The show placed fourth in the ratings in its first week against an all-rerun competition.  Its second week was even worse against season premieres on the other networks, including Lost and America's Next Top Model.  It only outrated a rerun of the pilot episode for the since-cancelled Just Legal on The WB.

Tom Shales of the Washington Post began his review of the pilot as follows:
"Sometimes bad things just happen, and it's nobody's fault," says one of the characters in Head Cases, a new Fox courtroom drama. Unfortunately that sounds an awful lot like the producer of the show attempting to let himself off the hook.

What's sad is that Head Cases, unlike the previous Fox series that have already made their premieres, has real promise and potential, especially in the character of young lawyer Jason Payne, as earnest Chris O'Donnell plays him.

The USA Today review was less kind:
Some shows just make you want to head in the opposite direction.  With Head Cases, the driving-away force is equal parts concept and cast. You'd be unlikely to rush toward any show about two recently institutionalized lawyers, forced into partnership by therapist blackmail. But Fox doesn't help its case by hiring Adam Goldberg and Chris O'Donnell, who seem ill-equipped to head this or any series, individually or collectively.

References

External links
 
Donnell, Goldberg Crazy for Head Cases, a TV Guide article

Fox Broadcasting Company original programming
2000s American legal television series
2005 American television series debuts
2005 American television series endings
2000s American comedy-drama television series
Television series by 20th Century Fox Television